Mahmut Hoşgiz (born 16 September 1975) is a Turkish footballer.

Career
Born in Hafik, Sivas, Hoşgiz played professional football for Sivasspor in the TFF First League, where he was club captain. He also previously played for Petrolofisi, Eyüpspor and Tokatspor.

References

1975 births
Living people
Turkish footballers
Sivasspor footballers
Tokatspor footballers

Association footballers not categorized by position